Germán Alirio Ospina Castro (born March 28, 1972, in La Unión, Valle del Cauca) is a retired male road cyclist from Colombia, who was a professional rider from 1996 to 1997.

Career

1996
1st in Stage 3 Clásico Mundo Ciclistico (COL)
1st in Stage 12 Vuelta a Colombia (COL)
1st in General Classification Clásica de El Carmen de Viboral (COL)
1997
1st in General Classification Vuelta a Antioquia (COL)
1st in General Classification Clásica a Itagüí (COL)

References
 

1972 births
Living people
Sportspeople from Valle del Cauca Department
Colombian male cyclists
Vuelta a Colombia stage winners